Skid is a 1970 debut album by Irish band Skid Row featuring guitar virtuoso Gary Moore. Released in October 1970, it made #30 on the UK album chart.

Track listing
Side One
"Mad Dog Woman" – (Brendan Shiels)
"Virgo's Daughter" – (Shiels)
"Heading Home Again" – (Shiels)
"An Awful Lot Of Woman" – (Shiels)
"Unco-Up Showband Blues" – (Shiels, Gary Moore, Noel Bridgeman)
Side Two
"For Those Who Do" – (Shiels, Moore, Bridgeman)
"After I'm Gone" – (Shiels)
"The Man Who Never Was" – (Shiels, Moore, Bridgeman)
"Felicity" – (Moore)

Personnel
Skid Row
Gary Moore – guitar, vocals
Brush Shiels – bass, vocals
Noel Bridgeman – drums, vocals

References

External links

1970 debut albums
Skid Row (Irish band) albums
CBS Records albums
Epic Records albums